The League of Legends All-Star event (ASE) is an international off-season League of Legends tournament featuring fan-voted players from each of the twelve professional regions' top level leagues. The tournament is typically held in December, after the World Championship, and features professional League of Legends players competing in various unconventional game modes.

Overview

References 

All-star games
All-Star
Riot Games competitions